"Mutual Admiration Society" can refer to:

Literature

 Mutual admiration society, a term referring to people who admire or flatter each other, originated in the 1800s but came into common use in the latter 1950s, popularized by the song of the same name.
 The Westminster Review, Baldwin, Cradock, and Joy (London), p. 400, "said members did accordingly resolve themselves into a little mutual admiration society for the entertainment and benefit of their visitors." (1824)
 Virginia Woolf used the term in Night and Day (1919).
 The Mutual Admiration Society (MAS) was a literary society of women who became friends at Somerville College, Oxford. Its members included Dorothy L. Sayers, Muriel St Clare Byrne, Charis Frankenburg, Dorothy Rowe, and Amphilis Throckmorton Middlemore, among others.

Music

 "Mutual Admiration Society (song)", a song from the musical Happy Hunting

Albums
 Mutual Admiration Society - Joe Locke & David Hazeltine Quartet, album by the Joe Locke and David Hazeltine Quartet
 Mutual Admiration Society (collaboration), between singer/songwriter Glen Phillips and bluegrass trio Nickel Creek
 Mutual Admiration Society (album), an album by the above group